Roseland NYC Live is a live album by English electronic music band Portishead. It was released on 2 November 1998 by Go! Beat. A PAL format VHS video was released the same year, with a DVD version following four years later. Although the New York Philharmonic is credited as appearing in the video, none of the musicians are members of the Philharmonic, nor is the Philharmonic credited in the audio album.

Content
The album was engineered by Rik Simpson.

Unlike the CD, all the tracks on the DVD were recorded at the Roseland Ballroom. The DVD version has a bonus elements section, containing the music videos for "Numb", "Sour Times", "All Mine", "Over" and "Only You", as well as short films "Road Trip" and "Wandering Star" and the Portishead short film To Kill a Dead Man.

Track listing

Video
"Humming"
"Cowboys" (Barrow, Gibbons)
"All Mine"
"Half Day Closing"
"Over"
"Only You"
"Seven Months"
"Numb"
"Undenied" (Barrow, Gibbons)
"Mysterons"
"Sour Times"
"Elysium"
"Glory Box"
"Roads"
"Strangers"
"Western Eyes"

Personnel
Credits adapted from the liner notes of Roseland NYC Live.

Portishead
 Geoff Barrow – decks ; drums ; musical direction
 Beth Gibbons – vocals 
 Adrian Utley – Moog ; guitar ; musical direction, orchestral arrangements

Additional musicians

 John Baggott – keyboards 
 Jim Barr – bass 
 John Cornick – trombone 
 Dave Ford – trumpet ; flugelhorn 
 Will Gregory – oboe ; baritone sax 
 Andy Hague – trumpet ; flugelhorn 
 Ben Waghorn – alto flute ; alto sax 
 Clive Deamer – drums ; percussion 
 Andy Smith – decks 
 Nick Ingman – conducting ; orchestral arrangements
 New York Philharmonic – orchestra

Technical

 Portishead – production 
 Dave McDonald – front of house
 Keith Grant – live audio engineering
 Ian Huffam – engineering 
 Rik Simpson – engineering
 John Thompson – backline technician
 Huw Williams – backline technician
 Andy Taylor – concert sound
 Jeff Hoffberger – concert sound
 Dave Hewitt – audio recording
 Sean McClintock – audio recording
 Phil Gitomer – audio recording
 Øystein Halvorsen – engineering 
 Erik Lloyd Walkoff – production 
 Paul Read – engineering assistance 
 Geoff Barrow – production 
 Adrian Utley – production 
 John Neilson – engineering

Artwork
 Sarah Sherley-Price – design

Charts

Notes

References

1998 live albums
1998 video albums
Albums produced by Geoff Barrow
Live video albums
Portishead (band) live albums
Portishead (band) video albums